Andries Stephanus Ferreira (born 29 March 1990) is a South African rugby union player for the US Carcassonne in the Pro D2. His regular playing position is lock.

Career

Youth and Varsity Cup rugby

Ferreira went to Despatch High School in his home town of Despatch and was selected to represent Eastern Province at the Under-16 Grant Khomo Week tournaments in 2005 and 2006.

He then moved to Pretoria, where he finished his schooling at Afrikaanse Hoër Seunskool. He was selected in the  squad that played at the Under-18 Craven Week competition in 2008; at the conclusion of that tournament, he was also included in a South African Under-18 Elite Squad and was included in the South Africa Schools squad for 2008. He was also named in the  squad that played in the Under-19 Provincial Championship later that year.

He was once again included in the Under-19 squad for their 2009 campaign, as well as appearing for them at Under-21 level in the same season. In 2010, Ferreira made one appearance for  during the 2010 Varsity Cup competition and was a key player for the  side in the 2010 Under-21 Provincial Championship, scoring two tries in thirteen starts for the side. This included a try in their semi-final match against the  that proved to be decisive in a 39–35 victory, but Ferreira missed out on the final.

He made one appearances for university side  in the 2011 Varsity Cup competition and was also included in the  squad for the 2011 Vodacom Cup. However, despite being named on the bench for their match against , he failed to make any senior appearances for the Blue Bulls.

Cheetahs

He made two more starts in the Currie Cup before a knee injury curtailed the remainder of his season.

He also made on appearance on loan at the  during the 2013 Currie Cup First Division before a shoulder injury ruled him out for the rest of the season.

He returned to Super Rugby action during the 2014 Super Rugby season, making six appearances – only two of those being starts.

Zebre

It was then announced that Ferreira would join Italian Pro12 side Zebre for the 2014–15 Pro12 season. He played in eight matches for Zebre – six in the Pro12 and a further two appearances in the 2014–15 European Rugby Challenge Cup – but his contract was cancelled by mutual consent on 31 December 2014.

Golden Lions / Lions

Toyota Industries Shuttles

After the 2015 Super Rugby season, Ferreira joined Japanese Top League side Toyota Industries Shuttles for the 2015–16 season. He made three appearances, scoring one try in their match against Kubota Spears.

Toulon

In September 2016, Ferreira joined Top 14 side  as a medical joker following an injury to Juan Smith.

Edinburgh

References

1990 births
Living people
People from Despatch, Eastern Cape
Afrikaner people
South African people of Portuguese descent
South African rugby union players
Rugby union locks
Cheetahs (rugby union) players
Free State Cheetahs players
Griffons (rugby union) players
Golden Lions players
Lions (United Rugby Championship) players
Edinburgh Rugby players
South African expatriate rugby union players
South African expatriate sportspeople in Italy
Expatriate rugby union players in Italy
Zebre Parma players
Toyota Industries Shuttles Aichi players
South African expatriate sportspeople in Japan
Expatriate rugby union players in Japan
Tshwane University of Technology alumni
US Carcassonne players
Blue Bulls players
RC Toulonnais players
Hurricanes (rugby union) players
Bulls (rugby union) players
Rugby union players from the Eastern Cape